Xangongo Airport  is an airport near Xangongo, Angola. It was built by the Cubans in 1988 as a forward air base during the last campaign against apartheid South Africa in the Angolan Civil War.

See also

 List of airports in Angola
 Transport in Angola

References

External links
 OurAirports - Xangongo
OpenStreetMap - Xangongo

Airports in Angola
Cunene Province
Airports established in 1988
1988 establishments in Angola